The discography of Athens, Georgia-based indie pop group of Montreal includes eighteen full-length albums, ten extended plays, six compilation albums, and twenty-eight singles.

Studio albums

Live albums

Compilation albums

Extended plays

Singles

Other appearances

On soundtracks

In record label collections

Kindercore

Happy Happy Birthday To Me

Polyvinyl

In magazine collections
 1999 CMJ New Music Volume 66 February 1999
 2005 SPEX CD #52
 2006 Paste Magazine Sampler Issue 23
 2007 All Areas Volume 80
 2007 Paste Magazine Sampler Issue 28
 2007 SPEX CD #7
 2007 Sounds - Now!
 2007 Wake Up! 15-track Guide To New North American Indie
 2007 ¬ 11
 2008 Paste Magazine Sampler Issue 48
 2008 Sounds - Now!
 2008 Untitled (Spex Magazine)
 2009 Rare Trax Vol. 62 - New Psychedelic Classics: The Eclectic Kool Aid Sound Spectacle

In other compilations
1999 Second Thoughts
1999 The Gants Never Again! - Tribute To The Gants
2000 Rabid Chords 002 VU Tribute
2000 Songs For A Crimson Eggtree
2000 U.S. Pop Life Vol. 5 ~ Athens/ The Invention To Be Nobody & Nowhere
2001 Homesleep Home²: Cover Songs
2001 The Winter Report; A Hype City Compilation
2002 New Adventures In Lo-Fi Bonus CD
2003 Comes With A Smile Vol. 8 - Like Others Need Oxygen
2004 POW! To The People
2004 Untitled (Ghetto Kitty Island)
2005 Dockdelux
2005 Vice CD/DVD #2 Presented By Sony Connect - Volume 12 Number 2
2007 Bad News Records Special Sampler '07
2007 Best Of 2007
2007 For The Kids Three!
2007 Iceland Airwaves '07!
2007 Optimus Blitz Aprova Os Melhores De 2007
2007 Reprises Inrocks
2007 Scraps
2007 Slottsfjell Festival 2007
2007 This Is Next - Indie's Biggest Hits Volume 1
2007 We Deliver The Goods
2008 D Is For Disco, E Is For Dancing
2008 Give Listen Help
2008 KUT Live Vol. 4
2008 Rough Trade Shops - Counter Culture 07
2008 The Green Owl Compilation: A Benefit For The Energy Action Coalition
2008 The Who Covered
2008 Tsugi Sampler 013
2008 Une Rentrée 2008 - Vol. 3
2008 We Love U! (The Hi-Lo Tunez Plan: 10th Step)
2009 Los Angeles Live Volume Six

Notes

References

External links
 Official website
 [ of Montreal overview] at Allmusic
 of Montreal discography at Discogs

Discographies of American artists
Pop music group discographies
Discography